Pic des Souffles is a mountain in the French Alps. Located in the Massif des Écrins, the mountain is 3,099 m tall.

References

Mountains of Hautes-Alpes
Alpine three-thousanders
Mountains of the Alps